Reda El-Azab (born July 9, 1986) is an Egyptian footballer who plays as a right-back for Egyptian Second Division side Tersana SC.

Club career
He started his career with Baladeyet El-Mahalla youth team then moved to Ittihad El-Shorta then moved to Zamalek in 2014.

Honours

Club
Zamalek SC
Egyptian Premier League (1): 2014-2015

References

External links
Reda El Azab at Footballdatabase

1986 births
Living people
Ittihad El Shorta SC players
Azab
Azab
Egyptian Premier League players
Association football fullbacks